Mysterion may refer to:

 Mysterion (film), a 1991 documentary film by Pirjo Honkasalo
 Mysterion (Last Exile), key secret riddle in the steampunk anime Last Exile
 Mysterion the Mind Reader, Canadian mentalist
 Greek term for Sacred mysteries of Christianity
 Mysterion, alter-ego of the character Kenny McCormick in South Park
 Durand Mysterion, stage name of Ron Easley, guitarist with Tav Falco's Panther Burns
 Track #10 on CD#6 of Dreamscapes, compilation by synthpop band Alphaville
 Track #9 on Hell Is Here, a 1999 album by thrash metal band The Crown
 Custom car by "Big Daddy", Ed Roth
 Mysterion (comics)

See also
 Mysterians (disambiguation)
 Mysteron
 Mystery (disambiguation)